Khalim Nigmatullin (born March 30, 1972) is a Russian and Soviet former professional ice hockey defenceman, who became a coach after completing his career as a player.

Awards and honors

References

External links
Biographical information and career statistics from Eliteprospects.com, or The Internet Hockey Database

1972 births
Living people
Neftyanik Almetyevsk players
Ak Bars Kazan players
HC Neftekhimik Nizhnekamsk
Rubin Tyumen players
Severstal Cherepovets players
Russian ice hockey defencemen